The 173rd New York State Legislature, consisting of the New York State Senate and the New York State Assembly, met from January 4, 1961, to March 31, 1962, during the third and fourth years of Nelson Rockefeller's governorship, in Albany.

Background
Under the provisions of the New York Constitution of 1938, re-apportioned in 1953, 58 Senators and 150 assemblymen were elected in single-seat districts for two-year terms. The senatorial districts consisted either of one or more entire counties; or a contiguous area within a single county. The counties which were divided into more than one senatorial district were Kings (nine districts), New York (six),  Queens (five), Bronx (four), Erie (three), Nassau (three), Westchester (three), Monroe (two) and Onondaga (two). The Assembly districts consisted either of a single entire county (except Hamilton Co.), or of contiguous area within one county.

At this time there were two major political parties: the Republican Party and the Democratic Party. The Liberal Party also nominated tickets.

Elections
The 1960 New York state election, was held on November 8. The only two statewide elective offices were two seats on the New York Court of Appeals. Two Republican judges were elected, Stanley H. Fuld with Democratic and Liberal endorsement; and Sydney F. Foster with Liberal endorsement. The approximate party strength at this election, as expressed by the average vote for the judges on the different tickets, was: Republicans 3,281,000; Democrats 3,247,000; and Liberals 413,000.

Four of the seven women members of the previous legislature—State Senator Janet Hill Gordon (Rep.), a lawyer of Norwich; and Assemblywomen Bessie A. Buchanan (Dem.), a retired musical actress and dancer of Harlem; Dorothy Bell Lawrence (Rep.), a former school teacher of Manhattan; and Aileen B. Ryan (Dem.), a former school teacher of the Bronx—were re-elected.

The New York state election, 1961, was held on November 7. No statewide elective offices were up for election. Three vacancies in the Assembly were filled.

Sessions
The Legislature met for the first regular session (the 184th) at the State Capitol in Albany on January 4, 1961; and adjourned on March 25.

Joseph F. Carlino (Rep.) was re-elected Speaker.

Walter J. Mahoney (Rep.) was re-elected Temporary President of the State Senate.

The Legislature met for a special session at the State Capitol in Albany on August 21, 1961; and adjourned after a session of six hours. This session was called to consider legislation concerning New York City's school system.

The Legislature met for another special session at the State Capitol in Albany on November 9, 1961; and adjourned on the next day. This session was called to consider legislation concerning the creation of fallout shelters at schools and colleges, and the re-apportionment of New York's congressional districts under the 1960 U.S. census.

The Legislature met for the second regular session (the 185th) at the State Capitol in Albany on January 3, 1962; and adjourned on March 31.

State Senate

Districts

Senators
The asterisk (*) denotes members of the previous Legislature who continued in office as members of this Legislature. Ivan Warner changed from the Assembly to the Senate at the beginning of this Legislature.

Note: For brevity, the chairmanships omit the words "...the Committee on (the)..."

Employees
 Secretary: John J. Sandler, died on March 4, 1961
 William S. King, acting from March 4 to May 4, 1961
 John J. Sullivan, from May 4, 1961

State Assembly

Assemblymen
The asterisk (*) denotes members of the previous Legislature who continued in office as members of this Legislature.

Note: For brevity, the chairmanships omit the words "...the Committee on (the)..."

Employees
 Clerk: Ansley B. Borkowski
 Sergeant-at-Arms: Raymond J. Roche
 Deputy Journal Clerk: Maude E. Ten Eyck

Notes

Sources
 N.Y. Legislature Remains In Control of Republicans in the Tonawanda News, of Tonawanda, on November 9, 1960
 Members of the New York Senate (1960s) at Political Graveyard
 Members of the New York Assembly (1960s) at Political Graveyard

173
1961 in New York (state)
1962 in New York (state)
1961 U.S. legislative sessions
1962 U.S. legislative sessions